Tushmanlu (also Romanized as Tūshmānlū; also known as Doshman, Doshmanlī, Doshmānlū, Dūshmallī, and Toshmanlū) is a village in Sanjabad-e Gharbi Rural District, in the Central District of Kowsar County, Ardabil Province, Iran. At the 2006 census, its population was 153, in 34 families.

References 

Towns and villages in Kowsar County